Bengt Lindqvist (born 21 April 1934) is a Swedish ice hockey player. He competed in the men's tournament at the 1960 Winter Olympics.

References

External links
 

1934 births
Living people
Swedish ice hockey players
Olympic ice hockey players of Sweden
Ice hockey players at the 1960 Winter Olympics
People from Eskilstuna
Sportspeople from Södermanland County